Corinth, Tennessee may refer to the following places in Tennessee:
Corinth, Knox County, Tennessee
Corinth, Sumner County, Tennessee